"Stealing Kisses" is a song written and recorded by American country music singer Lori McKenna. It first appeared on her 2004 album Bittertown. It was later recorded by American country music singer Faith Hill.  It was released in September 2006 as the fifth single from the album Fireflies.  The song reached #36 on the Billboard Hot Country Songs chart.

Critical reception
Kevin John Coyne of Country Universe reviewed the song favorably. He wrote that "Hill infuses Lori McKenna’s saga of a slowly sinking housewife with a bittersweet Wynette-worthy vocal."

Personnel
From Fireflies liner notes.
 Tom Bukovac - electric guitar
 Dan Dugmore - Dobro
 Stuart Duncan - mandolin
 Shannon Forrest - drums
 Byron Gallimore - keyboard, organ
 Jimmy Nichols - piano
 Bryan Sutton - acoustic guitar
 Kelly Willis - background vocals
 Glenn Worf - bass guitar

Chart performance

References

Songs about kissing
2006 singles
2005 songs
Faith Hill songs
Songs written by Lori McKenna
Song recordings produced by Byron Gallimore
Warner Records singles